This list of tallest buildings in Wuhan ranks skyscrapers in Wuhan, Hubei, China by height. The tallest building in Wuhan is currently the Wuhan Center, which rises 443.1 m (1,454 ft). The tallest building that is under construction in Wuhan is the Wuhan Greenland Center which will have a height of 475.6 m (1,560 ft) and will be one of the tallest buildings in China when it is completed.

Wuhan is the capital of and largest city in Hubei Province, as well as the largest city in Central China. It has a population of approximately 10,338,000 people (2014), with about 6,434,373 residents in its urban area (2010).

Wuhan is recognized as the political, economic, financial, cultural, educational, and transportation center of central China, with 267 buildings with a height more than 150 m (492 ft), Wuhan ranks as the 5th best skyline city in China and 8th in the world.

Tallest buildings
This lists ranks Wuhan skyscrapers that stand at least 150 m (492 feet) tall, based on standard height measurement. This includes spires and architectural details but does not include antenna masts. Existing structures are included for ranking purposes based on present height. All the structures in this list have been topped out, but some may not be ready to use.

Tallest under construction, approved, and proposed

Under construction
This lists buildings that are under construction in Wuhan and are planned to rise at least 150 m (492 feet). The list has 87 buildings in total. Buildings that are already topped out are not included in the list.

Proposed
This lists buildings that are proposed for construction in Wuhan and are planned to rise at least 150 m (492 feet).

References

General
 Emporis.com-Wuhan
 Skycraperpage.com-Wuhan
 Skyscrapers of Wuhan on Gaoloumi (In Chinese)

Specific

External links
The World's best Skyline

Wuhan